Manoblemma is a monotypic moth genus of the family Noctuidae. Its only species, Manoblemma cryptica, is found in Japan. Both the genus and species were first described by Yoshimoto in 1999.

References

Acontiinae
Monotypic moth genera